Jake Flannery (born 7 June 1999) is an Irish rugby union player for United Rugby Championship and Champions Cup side Ulster. He plays as either a fly-half or fullback and represents Shannon in the All-Ireland League.

Early life
Born in Bansha, County Tipperary, Flannery first began playing rugby with Kilfeacle and District RFC, before going on to attend Rockwell College, where he helped guide the school to the semi-finals of the 2018 Munster Schools Rugby Senior Cup. He achieved a maximum of 625 points in his leaving cert, which resulted in Flannery being awarded the prestigious Naughton Foundation scholarship, and he is now studying Chemical engineering at the University of Limerick.

Munster
Flannery made his Munster A debut in their 34–17 win against Dragons A in round 3 of the 2018–19 Celtic Cup on 21 September 2018. Following his performances for Munster A and with the Ireland under-20s, Flannery joined the Munster academy ahead of the 2019–20 season, and he made his senior competitive debut for the province as a replacement in their 2019–20 Pro14 round 12 fixture against Italian side Zebre on 21 February 2020, which Munster won 28–0. Flannery was a late call up to the bench after Shane Daly was injured during the warm-up and Darren Sweetnam was promoted to the starting XV. He joined the Munster senior squad on a one-year contract for the 2021–22 season. Flannery made his first start for the province in their 31–17 win against Italian side Benetton in round 16 of the 2020–21 Pro14 on 19 March 2021.

Ulster
Flannery joined Ulster on a one-year contract from the 2022–23 season.

Ireland
Selected in the Ireland under-20s squad for the 2019 Six Nations Under 20s Championship, Flannery started the wins against England, Scotland, Italy, France, and Wales, as Ireland secured their first grand slam in the tournament since 2007. He was retained in the under-20s squad for the 2019 World Rugby Under 20 Championship when it was confirmed in May 2019, playing in the pool B games against England, Australia and Italy, and the play-off games against England and New Zealand. He was selected for the Emerging Ireland squad for the Toyota Challenge in South Africa in September 2022.

Honours

Ireland under-20s
Six Nations Under 20s Championship:
Winner (1): 2019
Grand Slam:
Winner (1): 2019
Triple Crown:
Winner (1): 2019

References

External links
Ulster Rugby profile
Munster Senior Profile
Munster Academy Profile
U20 Six Nations Profile
URC Profile

1999 births
Living people
People educated at Rockwell College
Rugby union players from County Tipperary
Irish rugby union players
Shannon RFC players
Munster Rugby players
Ulster Rugby players
Rugby union fly-halves
Rugby union fullbacks